Alexander Troup (4 May 1895 – 1951), known as Alex Troup and Alec Troup, was a Scottish footballer who played at both professional and international levels as a winger.

Career
Born in Forfar, Troup played club football in Scotland and England for Dundee and Everton.

Troup made five appearances for the Scottish national team between 1920 and 1926. He also played for the Scottish League XI twice in 1921.

References

1895 births
1951 deaths
Scottish footballers
Scotland international footballers
Dundee F.C. players
Everton F.C. players
Scottish Football League players
English Football League players
Association football wingers
Forfar Athletic F.C. players
Ayr United F.C. players
Scottish Football League representative players
Date of death missing
Place of death missing